Rugby Town Hall is a municipal building on Evreux Way in the town centre of Rugby, Warwickshire, England. The building is the headquarters of Rugby Borough Council.

History
Two previous town halls existed on High Street: The first one was built in 1857, designed by Edward Welby Pugin and James Murray, with an extension made in 1919, this was used as the municipal offices until 1900, when it was converted into a cinema called Vint's Palace of Varieties. Most of the building except for the extension was destroyed by a fire in 1921, and was replaced by a building which was until 2009 a Woolworths shop.

The second one dated from 1900, in a building constructed using money left in the will of George Charles Benn, who in his will of 1895 left £6,000 to the local council to construct a building that would be useful to the town. It was constructed on the site of the former ‘Shoulder of Mutton Inn’. It was used by the council until 1937, when they moved to an early 19th century property known as "The Lawn" on Newbold Road, and the second town hall was converted into a Marks and Spencer shop, which it remained until 2015.

After civic leaders found that "The Lawn" was inadequate for their needs, they elected to construct a purpose-built facility. The current building, the third town hall, was built between 1959 and 1961. Adjoining it to the north is a functions venue called Benn Hall which was built at the same time. The Town Hall and Benn Hall were both formally opened by Queen Elizabeth The Queen Mother on 5 July 1961. It was designed by J.C. Prestwich & Sons, and consists of two brick neo-Georgian wings, fronted by a white stone entrance portico, the top of which is inscribed with the borough motto "Floreat Rugbeia", Latin for "May Rugby Flourish".

The architecture historian Nikolaus Pevsner did not hold a favourable view of the town hall, describing it as "quite dead architecturally".

During 1984-85 the town hall made the national news when it was the scene of protests against Rugby council's controversial decision to remove the words ‘sexual orientation’ from their Equal Opportunities policy. This was widely interpreted as a 'ban on gays' and caused uproar, and led to large protests from gay rights campaigners and politicians, including the MP Chris Smith, who used the occasion to choose to "come out" as Britain's first gay MP. The council eventually bowed to pressure to reverse the decision in early 1985.

A bronze sculpture commemorating Sir Frank Whittle, the "Father of the Jet Engine", was installed at Chestnut Field just outside the town hall in 2005.

In more recent times solar panels were installed on the roof of the building.

Gallery

References

Buildings and structures in Rugby, Warwickshire
City and town halls in Warwickshire
Government buildings completed in 1961
1961 establishments in England